Heinz Kiehl (6 June 1943 – 26 July 2016) was a German wrestler who competed in the 1964 Summer Olympics and the 1968 Summer Olympics for West Germany.

Kiehl was born on 6 June 1943 in Oggersheim. He won a bronze medal in 1964 the light-heavyweight division.

References

External links
 

1943 births
2016 deaths
Olympic wrestlers of the United Team of Germany
Olympic wrestlers of West Germany
Wrestlers at the 1964 Summer Olympics
Wrestlers at the 1968 Summer Olympics
German male sport wrestlers
Olympic bronze medalists for the United Team of Germany
Olympic medalists in wrestling
Medalists at the 1964 Summer Olympics
21st-century German people
20th-century German people